The 1992 French Grand Prix was a Formula One motor race held at Magny-Cours on 5 July 1992. It was the eighth race of the 1992 Formula One World Championship.

The 69-lap race was won by Nigel Mansell, driving a Williams-Renault, after he started from pole position. Mansell took his sixth victory of the season by 46 seconds from teammate Riccardo Patrese, who led the first 18 laps. Martin Brundle finished third in a Benetton-Ford.

Pre-race
The usual Friday morning pre-qualifying session was cancelled when the Andrea Moda Formula team failed to arrive at the circuit. The team's transporter had been stuck in traffic due to a blockade by French lorry drivers, and although all the other teams had also been affected, Andrea Moda were the only team to fail to arrive. The remaining four cars in the pre-qualifying pool therefore progressed automatically to the main qualifying sessions.

Qualifying

Qualifying report
Both Williams cars qualified ahead of the McLarens with Nigel Mansell in pole position ahead of his teammate Riccardo Patrese, Ayrton Senna, Gerhard Berger, Michael Schumacher and Frenchman Jean Alesi.

Qualifying classification

Race

Race report
At the start, Patrese got by Mansell while Berger got ahead of Senna and Martin Brundle was able to sneak by Alesi. At the Adelaide hairpin, Schumacher tried to pass Senna but instead hit him, taking Senna out and forcing himself to pit. Meanwhile, Patrese and Mansell were side by side but Patrese kept the lead. Patrese led Mansell, Berger, Brundle, Alesi and Häkkinen.

Nothing changed until lap 11 when Berger's engine failed. Soon afterwards it began to rain so heavily that the race was stopped. After some time the rain decreased and the grid formed up again. The race would be decided on the aggregate times of both parts of the race. Patrese took the lead again with Alesi getting ahead of Mika Häkkinen's Lotus as well. Mansell tried to pass his teammate again but Patrese defended and once again kept the lead. Further back, Schumacher again tried too hard, hitting Stefano Modena in the Jordan, dropping out of the race with a broken front suspension. Patrese led Mansell, Brundle, Alesi, Häkkinen and Comas on aggregate. Patrese then waved Mansell through on track and soon Mansell got ahead on aggregate. When Patrese was quizzed after the race on whether team orders existed in the Williams team he refused to comment.

It began to rain again and everyone pitted for wets with Alesi leaving the change too late and dropping down to sixth. His engine failed on lap 61. Mansell won with Patrese making it a Williams 1-2 ahead of Brundle, Häkkinen, Comas and Herbert. This was Brundle's first podium; he had been disqualified from his podium finish at the 1984 Detroit Grand Prix.

Thus, at the halfway stage of the season, Mansell led the championship with 66 points compared to Patrese's 34. Schumacher was third with 26, Senna was fourth with 18, Berger was fifth with 18, Alesi was sixth with 11, Brundle was seventh with nine and Alboreto was eighth with five. In the constructors championship, Williams had 100 points and were well ahead of the field: McLaren were second with 36, Benetton were third with 35 and Ferrari were fourth with 13.

Due to his sabbatical from Formula One in 1992, the race was only the second time since he first appeared on the podium for his home race in 1981 that Alain Prost was not on the podium for the French Grand Prix. Prost had won the French GP in 1981, 1983, 1988, 1989 and 1990. He was second in 1982, 1986 and 1991, and finished third in 1985 and 1987. The only podium he missed from 1981-1991 was at Dijon in 1984 when he finished seventh after problems with a loose wheel.

Race classification

Championship standings after the race

Drivers' Championship standings

Constructors' Championship standings

References

French Grand Prix
Grand Prix
French Grand Prix
French Grand Prix